The Alexandria Fire Department (AFD) provides fire protection and emergency medical services to the independent city of Alexandria, Virginia.

History 

The first fire company in Alexandria was the Friendship Fire Company, founded in 1774. George Washington is reported to have been a part of it, but no records remain to prove that, however he did purchase a fire engine for the company in 1775.

The first paid firefighters were hired in 1855 and the Alexandria Fire Department was established in 1866. Before that the City of Alexandria was served by multiple volunteer departments. By the end of the Civil War, many of the volunteer companies were under staffed so, in 1866, the City Council passed an act to combine the remaining fire companies into the Alexandria Fire Department.

In 1977, the department announced they were no longer hiring firefighters who smoked and anyone hired "signed a contract that included a provision against smoking", as part of a larger push for stricter health requirements. Alexandria was among the first departments in the country to have similar requirements.

Volunteer fire fighters, as opposed to volunteers who work in stations and other roles, effectively ended in 1981 when the City passed new regulations requiring all fire fighters to meet the stricter standards applied to career fire fighters. Former volunteers continued to protest that decision through the mid-1980s, often invoking George Washington's name who they regard as taking part in the first volunteer fire company in Alexandria.

Along with other departments, units from AFD responded to the September 11 attacks at The Pentagon and the Congressional baseball shooting in 2017, which took place in the Del Ray neighborhood of Alexandria.

In early 2021, Alexandria became the first locality in Virginia to authorize public unions to collectively bargain, after Virginia allowed localities to do so for the first time on May 1, 2021 after the Supreme Court of Virginia banned the practice in 1977. The union representing Alexandria firefighters, IAFF Local 2141, became the first that voted to collectively bargain.

Operations

Marine Operations 
The Marine Operations Division was started in 1997 to provide protection in the various waterways in and adjacent to the city. The team is trained in both open water and swiftwater rescue as well as marine firefighting. Two Zodiac inflatables (Boat 204 and Boat 214) are available to be rapidly deployed in all weather conditions. The inflatables are designed to be towed by either Engine 204 or Support Unit 204 (a Chevy Suburban), which is equipped with a variety of water rescue equipment. Additionally the division has a  MetaCraft Firestorm 50 fireboat, the Vigilant, equipped with two  pumps attached to four fire monitors.

Fire Prevention and Life Safety 
The Fire Prevention and Life Safety (FPLS) Section is composed of several units –  Fire Prevention Inspections,  Fire Protection Systems Retesting,  Environmental Investigations &  Fire Investigations. The Fire Prevention and Life Safety Section is responsible for enforcement of the  Virginia Statewide Fire Prevention Code, applicable sections of the Virginia Construction Code and related sections of the Code of the City of Alexandria.

Stations and apparatus 
On June 12, 2021, the City of Alexandria Fire Department will implemented an organizational restructure. It included Specialty Team relocations, apparatus relocations, Advanced Life Support (ALS) unit upgrades, Battalion Management Teams (BMT), the addition of Emergency Medical Services (EMS) lieutenants and other quality improvements.

ALS Suppression Units will be minimally staffed with one ALS provider on several suppression units (engines and trucks marked with "ALS" in the chart below). Upgrading those engines and trucks to ALS units improves ALS coverage in Old Town and Landmark areas, higher medical call volume.

A new station is planned as part of the Landmark Mall redevelopment.

See also
 List of Virginia fire departments

References

External links

 
 Friendship Firehouse Museum

Fire departments in Virginia
Fire
1866 establishments in Virginia
Government agencies established in 1866
Alexandria, Virginia